The African Journal of Urology is a quarterly peer-reviewed medical journal of urology. It is the official journal of the Pan African Urological Surgeons' Association and is published on their behalf by Elsevier. It is also available online from African Journals OnLine. Articles are published in English and French and abstracted and indexed in Scopus and African Index Medicus.

References

External links 

Publications established in 1995
Urology journals
Elsevier academic journals
Multilingual journals
Quarterly journals
Academic journals associated with learned and professional societies